Itaquascon is a genus of water bear or moss piglet, a tardigrade in the class Eutardigrada.

Species
 Itaquascon biserovi Pilato, Binda and Moncada, 1999
 Itaquascon cambewarrense Pilato, Binda and Claxton, 2002
 Itaquascon enckelli (Mihelcic, 1971)
 Itaquascon globuliferum Abe and Ito, 1994
 Itaquascon mongolicus Kaczmarek, Michalczyk and Wêglarska, 2002
 Itaquascon pawlowskii Wêglarska, 1973
 Itaquascon placophorum Maucci 1973
 Itaquascon simplex (Mihelcic 1971)
 Itaquascon umbellinae De Barros, 1939
 Itaquascon unguiculum Pilato, Binda and Claxton, 2002

References

Lizhi Wang. (2009) Tardigrades from the Yunnan-Guizhou Plateau (China) with description of two new species in the genera Mixibius (Eutardigrada: Hypsibiidae) and Pseudechiniscus (Heterotardigrada: Echiniscidae). Journal of Natural History 43:41-42, pages 2553-2570.

Hongqun Li, Xiaochen Li. (2008) Two new species of Hypsibiidae (Tardigrada: Eutardigrada) from China. Proceedings of the Biological Society of Washington 121:1, pages 41–48.

External links

Parachaela
Tardigrade genera
Polyextremophiles